= 2002-03 campioantk sammriese fmeminile =

1. REDIRECT Draft:2002-03 campioantk sammriese fmeminile
